The women's 1500 metres at the 2006 European Athletics Championships were held at the Ullevi on August 11 and August 13.

Medalists

Schedule

Results

Semifinals
First 4 in each heat (Q) and the next 4 fastest (q) advance to the Final.

Final

External links
Results

1500
1500 metres at the European Athletics Championships
2006 in women's athletics